Rehden is a Samtgemeinde ("collective municipality") in the district of Diepholz, in Lower Saxony, Germany. Its seat is in Rehden.

The Samtgemeinde Rehden consists of the following municipalities:

 Barver 
 Dickel 
 Hemsloh 
 Rehden
 Wetschen

Samtgemeinden in Lower Saxony